Oncideres jatai is a species of beetle in the family Cerambycidae. It was described by Bondar in 1953. It is known from Brazil.

References

jatai
Beetles described in 1953